Coptosia schuberti is a species of beetle in the family Cerambycidae. It was described by Ernst Fuchs in 1965. It is known from Turkey.

References

Saperdini
Beetles described in 1965